Škarda is an uninhabited Croatian island in the Adriatic Sea located between Premuda and Ist (island).

The hamlet of Škarda that consists of 16 dwellings was completely depopulated in the 1990s.

References

Islands of the Adriatic Sea
Islands of Croatia
Uninhabited islands of Croatia
Landforms of Zadar County